Commencement most commonly refers to graduation, the ceremony at which students receive academic degrees. It may also refer to:

 Commencement (album), a 2002 album by American band Deadsy
 Commencement (novel), a 2010 novel by J. Courtney Sullivan
 "Commencement" (Smallville), an episode in season four of Smallville
 "Commencement" (The West Wing), an episode in the fourth season of The West Wing
 Coming into force, or commencement, is the day legislation begins to have legal effect

See also
 Commencement speech, a speech given during university graduation in the U.S.
 Commencement Bay, in Puget Sound in Washington, U.S.